Ruff Sqwad are an English grime crew. The group was formed in 2001 in Bow, East London. Various members and affiliates of the crew are considered key figures in the early development of grime music.

Ruff Sqwad first became known in the early days of grime for the distinctive production style of the crew's producers. Early Ruff Sqwad instrumentals were released on white label, which are currently rare and fetch high prices on the second hand market. Notable early Ruff Sqwad instrumentals include Pied Piper, Functions on the Low and Misty Cold. Functions on the Low, produced by Ruff Sqwad affiliate XTC has been described as one of the greatest tracks in the history of British electronic music. The crew has released two mixtapes, Guns and Roses Volume. 1 and Guns and Roses Volume. 2, an extended play (2012) as well as an instrumental compilation album, White Label Classics.

History

Origins: 2001–2005
Ruff Sqwad was formed by a group of teenage school friends in East London in 2001 or 2002. Many of the group's best known instrumentals were made by Rapid and Dirty Danger on cheap home PCs as 14- and 15-year-olds. The group would regularly bunk school to record songs and to press up vinyl at Music House. The crew was active on the London pirate radio scene and at various times during the early 2000s had shows on Rinse FM, Heat, Flava, Mystic, and Deja Vu FM. During this period the group regularly released singles on white label vinyl on an imprint called Ruff Sqwad Recordings following a template laid out by Wiley's Wiley Kat Recordings.

Mixtape releases: 2005–2006
In 2005, Ruff Sqwad's first mixtape, Guns and Roses Volume. 1, was released. It was released in March 2005 on the independent record label Ruff Sqwad Recordings, and was very well received by the grime scene. It has been ranked amongst the best full-length studio albums of all time to come from the grime scene. The album was the first of a three-part album series.

Ruff Sqwad's second mixtape, Guns and Roses Volume. 2, was released in October 2006. It was released on the independent record label Ruff Sqwad Recordings, and was very well received by the grime scene. Along with their debut album, Guns and Roses Volume. 1, it has also been ranked amongst the best full-length studio albums of all time to come from the grime scene. During this period Ruff Sqwad performed regularly at live events including the very first Dirty Canvas night put on by NoHatsNoHoods.

Decline, breakup and new roster
Following the solo success of Tinchy Stryder and other crew members Ruff Sqwad became less active as a group. In 2011 the crew recorded a single called Mario Balotelli. In 2012 Rapid and Dirty Danger collaborated with NoHatsNoHoods to recover recordings previously thought to be lost of some of the group's early instrumentals which led to the release of a compilation album called White Label Classics. The group has been on hiatus since releasing Cold in 2013. In May 2015, Tinchy Stryder confirmed that Ruff Sqwad had split up, citing reasons such as internal conflicts and Slix not making music anymore. In December 2015, a music video for the new song That's Who We Are was released, starring original member Prince Rapid, previous member Fuda Guy and previously affiliated Roachee, all of them seemingly part of Ruff Sqwad.

Though Ruff Sqwad was not musically active as a group for the most part of 2015, the year showed a resurgence in other grime MC's utilising instrumental productions stemming from former and current members from Ruff Sqwad, such as the song Stormzy – Shut Up which used XTC's Functions on the Low instrumental.

Members
Ruff Sqwad currently has three members: Prince Rapid, Fuda Guy and Roachee.

Tinchy Stryder
Tinchy Stryder (Real name: Kwasi Danquah III, born 14 September 1986), has been a member of the Ruff Sqwad since 2001. He is the best known member of the group having had much mainstream success with his solo material. Stryder has been prominent in the grime scene since the early 2000s and was a member of Roll Deep crew for a short period of time early in his career. His solo discography includes three albums and two UK number 1 singles.

Roachee
Roachee has replaced Slix, seen in the "Thats How We Are" music video.

Dirty Danger
Dirty Danger (David Nkrumah, born 1984 and formerly known as Dirty Dangerous) is a grime MC and producer and founding member of Ruff Sqwad. Dirty Danger is one of the more active producers in the crew and his best known track is Misty Cold. He produced various tracks for Tinchy Stryder's debut album "Star in the Hood", as well as Ruff Sqwad's two Guns and Roses Mixtapes. He has been involved with the Ruff Sqwad movement from the outset and is a well-known artist within the grime scene. He has released two solo mixtapes I Ain't Rich Yet and Danger Season.

Prince Rapid
Rapid (Prince Owusu-Agyekum born 8 November 1985), is a grime musician and producer and founding member of Ruff Sqwad. Prince Rapid is one of the more active producers in the crew and is considered one of the best producers in the grime scene. He produced the group's first underground single, "Tings in Boots". He has had various solo releases including Turning Point and Rapid Fire.

In September 2015, Rapid created a war dub entitled "Pepper Riddim". This instrumental was later used in March 2015 by Chip on a song of the same name; a diss track directed at Tinie Tempah, Bugzy Malone, Devilman, Big Narstie and Saskilla. Chip's version of the song has accumulated over four million YouTube views, and sparked one of the most talked about grime beefs of the year. The instrumental has since been used by P Money, Yungen, Riko Dan and Lil Nasty among others.

Sir Spyro
Sir Spyro (born 1986), is a DJ and producer. Sir Spyro is the current DJ for Ruff Sqwad and is the tour DJ for Tinchy Stryder, he formally joined the group in 2011. Spyro has a regular show on BBC Radio 1Xtra and has released numerous solo EPs. He produced hit 'Big For Your Boots' for Stormzy.

Former members
Ruff Sqwad was founded in the year 2001 by Shifty Rydos, the original lineup also included Tinchy Stryder, Slix, Dirty Danger, Rapid, DJ Begg Frend and Mad Max. Frequent collaborators with the crew included XTC, Roachee, Wiley and Trim. DJ Scholar became a member of Ruff Sqwad in 2004 and remained in the crew until 2010. Fuda Guy joined the crew in 2006 and released a solo mixtape while in the group called Headgone before leaving the group in 2012. In December 2016, Fuda Guy again appeared as a member of Ruff Sqwad in the song That's Who We Are. Also appearing in the song is original member Prince Rapid and Roachee, who has been affiliated with the group earlier.

Membership

Current
Prince Rapid (2001–present)
Fuda Guy (2006–2010, 2015–present)
Roachee (2015–present)

Former
Tinchy Stryder (2001–2015)
Slix (2001–2015)
Dirty Danger (2001–2015)
DJ Begg Frend (2001–????)
Mad Max (2001–2006)
Shifty Rydos (2001–2010)
DJ Scholar (2004–2010; died 2021)
Sir Spyro (2011–2015)
XTC (2001–????)

Discography

Mixtapes

Bootleg mixtapes

Compilations

Videography

White label releases
 Anna
 Misty Cold
 Misty Cold Remix
 Tings in Boots
 Lethal Injection
 Love You Feel
 Pied Piper
 All Day Long
 Don't Trust/Ur Love Feels
 Together EP
 Underground/Wide Awake
 Xtra/And Ting
 Move 2 Dis
 No Base EP
 Rock EP
 From A Place
 Ruff Sqwad Man Dem

See also
Tinchy Stryder solo discography

References

External links

 Ruff Sqwad on MusicBrainz
Ruff Sqwad on Grimepedia

Takeover Entertainment artists
Tinchy Stryder
Post-dubstep music groups
Rappers from London
Alternative hip hop groups
Grime music groups
English hip hop groups
Musical groups established in 2001
Musical groups from the London Borough of Tower Hamlets